Fula Americans, Fulani Americans or Fulbe Americans are Americans of Fula (Fulani) (Fulbe) descent.

The first Fulani people who were forcibly expatriated to United States from the slave trade came from several parts of West and Central Africa. Many Fulbe came of places as Guinea, Senegal, Guinea-Bissau, Sierra Leone, Nigeria and Cameroon. So, most of the people who came from Senegal belonged to ethnic groups Mandinga and Fula. Recent Fulani arrivals immigranted to the United States during the 1990s and now make up a significant portion of the Muslim communities across America.

Notable people

Abdul Rahman Ibrahima Sori
Ayuba Suleiman Diallo
Bilali Document
Hamidou Diallo
Ira Aldridge
Omar ibn Said
Yarrow Mamout

References 

Africans in the United States